11th FFCC Awards
December 22, 2006

Best Film: 
 The Departed 
The 11th Florida Film Critics Circle Awards, given by the Florida Film Critics Circle on 22 December 2006, honored the best in film for 2006.

The Departed from director Martin Scorsese received 4 awards, including Best Picture, Director and Supporting Actor (Jack Nicholson). The awards for best lead acting went to Whitaker  (The Last King of Scotland) and Mirren (The Queen).

Winners
Best Actor: 
Forest Whitaker - The Last King of Scotland
Best Actress: 
Helen Mirren - The Queen
Best Animated Film: 
Monster House
Best Cinematography: 
Pan's Labyrinth (El laberinto del fauno) - Guillermo Navarro
Best Director: 
Martin Scorsese - The Departed
Best Documentary Film:
An Inconvenient Truth
Best Film: 
The Departed
Best Foreign Language Film: 
Pan's Labyrinth (El laberinto del fauno) • Mexico/Spain/United States
Best Screenplay: 
The Departed - William Monahan
Best Supporting Actor: 
Jack Nicholson - The Departed
Best Supporting Actress: 
Cate Blanchett - Notes on a Scandal
Pauline Kael Breakout Award:
Jennifer Hudson - Dreamgirls

References
Florida Film Critics Circle Awards 2006 IMDb

2
2006 film awards